This is a complete list of the operas of the Italian composer Ferdinando Paer (1771–1839).

List

Sources
Budden, Julian (1992), 'Paer, Ferdinando' in The New Grove Dictionary of Opera, ed. Stanley Sadie (London) 

 
Lists of operas by composer
Lists of compositions by composer